In the mathematical field of graph theory, a complete bipartite graph or biclique is a special kind of bipartite graph where every vertex of the first set is connected to every vertex of the second set.

Graph theory itself is typically dated as beginning with Leonhard Euler's 1736 work on the Seven Bridges of Königsberg. However, drawings of complete bipartite graphs were already printed as early as 1669, in connection with an edition of the works of Ramon Llull edited by Athanasius Kircher. Llull himself had made similar drawings of complete graphs three centuries earlier.

Definition 
A complete bipartite graph is a graph whose vertices can be partitioned into two subsets  and  such that no edge has both endpoints in the same subset, and every possible edge that could connect vertices in different subsets is part of the graph.

Examples 

 For any ,  is called a star. All complete bipartite graphs which are trees are stars.
 The graph  is called a claw, and is used to define the claw-free graphs.
 The graph  is called the utility graph.
 The maximal bicliques found as subgraphs of the digraph of a relation are called concepts. When a lattice is formed by taking meets and joins of these subgraphs, the relation has an Induced concept lattice. This type of analysis of relations is called formal concept analysis.

Properties 

Given a bipartite graph, testing whether it contains a complete bipartite subgraph  for a parameter  is an NP-complete problem.
A planar graph cannot contain  as a minor; an outerplanar graph cannot contain  as a minor (These are not sufficient conditions for planarity and outerplanarity, but necessary). Conversely, every nonplanar graph contains either  or the complete graph  as a minor; this is Wagner's theorem.
Every complete bipartite graph.  is a Moore graph and a -cage.
The complete bipartite graphs  and  have the maximum possible number of edges among all triangle-free graphs with the same number of vertices; this is Mantel's theorem. Mantel's result was generalized to -partite graphs and graphs that avoid larger cliques as subgraphs in Turán's theorem, and these two complete bipartite graphs are examples of Turán graphs, the extremal graphs for this more general problem.
The complete bipartite graph  has a maximum independent set of size 
The adjacency matrix of a complete bipartite graph  has eigenvalues ,  and 0; with multiplicity 1, 1 and  respectively.
A complete bipartite graph  has  spanning trees.
A complete bipartite graph  has a maximum matching of size 
A complete bipartite graph  has a proper -edge-coloring corresponding to a Latin square.
Every complete bipartite graph is a modular graph: every triple of vertices has a median that belongs to shortest paths between each pair of vertices.

See also 
 Biclique-free graph, a class of sparse graphs defined by avoidance of complete bipartite subgraphs
 Crown graph, a graph formed by removing a perfect matching from a complete bipartite graph
 Complete multipartite graph, a generalization of complete bipartite graphs to more than two sets of vertices
 Biclique attack

References 

Parametric families of graphs